Acanthothamnus is a monotypic genus in the family Celastraceae which contains only the species Acanthothamnus aphyllus. The genus is sometimes known by the unaccepted synonym Scandivepres and its natural range spans central Mexico.

Taxonomy
Acanthothamnus is most closely related to the genera Brexia and Canotia.

References

Celastraceae
Celastrales genera
Monotypic rosid genera